Phellodon maliensis is a species of tooth fungus in the family Bankeraceae. Found in Australia, it was originally described as a new species by Curtis Gates Lloyd in 1923. It was originally placed in Hydnum, until Dutch mycologist Rudolph Arnold Maas Geesteranus transferred it to the genus Phellodon in 1966.

References

External links

Fungi described in 1923
Fungi of Australia
Inedible fungi
maliensis